The 2015 International Champions Cup (or ICC) was a series of friendly association football tournaments. It was the first tournament played separately in Australia, China and the United States.

The Australian edition of the tournament featured three teams played across three matches at the Melbourne Cricket Ground on July 18, 21 and 24. Real Madrid were the first club to announce their involvement. Manchester City and Roma were later confirmed to take part in the Australian tournament. The Chinese edition of the tournament featured Real Madrid, Milan and Internazionale playing a total of three matches in Shenzhen, Guangzhou and Shanghai.

Real Madrid won both the Australian and the Chinese competitions.

The North American edition of the tournament featured 10 teams but some games were played in Mexico, Canada, Italy and England. Each team involved in the US edition played four games, except the three United States-based teams that only played two games. Select Major League Soccer (MLS) matches between the ICC competing teams counted towards the point total to allow MLS teams to have four games count on the table. 2014 International Champions Cup winners Manchester United were the first team to confirm their involvement in the US edition.

Teams 
Australia

 China

 North America and Europe

Venues 

Australia

China

North America and Europe

Matches 

Australia

China

North America and Europe

Note: Result taken from 2015 Major League Soccer season.

Note: Result taken from 2015 Major League Soccer season, counted as penalty loss for both teams.

Note: Result taken from 2015 Major League Soccer season.

Tables 
Australia

China

North America and Europe

Top goalscorers 

Note: Goals from Major League Soccer games not included.

Media coverage

References

External links 

 

International Champions Cup
International Champions Cup
International Champions Cup
International Champions Cup